Bradley Moses (born 3 April 1983) is a South African professional cricketer who currently plays first-class cricket for the Easterns. Born in Durban, he started his career with KwaZulu-Natal Inland in 2006 and also represented the Dolphins before joining Easterns for the 2011/12 season.

Moses has also played for several club teams in England and the Netherlands; during the 2009 season he assisted Harpenden Cricket Club in the Home Counties League and also played for Radcliffe-on-Trent and Flitwick. He then had a spell with VRA Amsterdam in 2011. In January 2012, it was announced that Moses had signed as the professional for Lancashire League club Bacup for the 2012 season. At the start of the 2013/14 season Brad went to Scotland to play for Stewarts Melville Royal High CC.

References

1983 births
Living people
Cricketers from Durban
South African cricketers
KwaZulu-Natal Inland cricketers
Dolphins cricketers
Easterns cricketers